

References

 Zoltewicz, J. A. & Deady, L. W. Quaternization of heteroaromatic compounds. Quantitative aspects. Adv. Heterocycl. Chem. 22, 71-121 (1978).

Chemical data pages
Chemical data pages cleanup